The 1981 Montreal Expos season was the 13th season in franchise history. They made it to the postseason for the first time in franchise history (the franchise's next appearance in the playoffs was in 2012, as the Washington Nationals). Their playoff run ended in the National League Championship Series against the Los Angeles Dodgers, with Rick Monday hitting a ninth-inning solo home run in game 5, subsequently referred to as "Blue Monday" by Expos fans. This was the closest the Expos ever got to a World Series appearance while in Montreal.

The season was separated into two halves due to the 1981 Major League Baseball strike.

Offseason 
 December 8, 1980: Jack O'Connor was drafted from the Expos by the Minnesota Twins in the rule 5 draft.
 December 12, 1980: Tony Bernazard was traded by the Expos to the Chicago White Sox for Rich Wortham.
 December 12, 1980: Willie Montañez was signed as a free agent by the Expos.
 January 15, 1981: Ken Macha was purchased from the Expos by the Toronto Blue Jays.
 February 18, 1981: Ray Burris was signed as a free agent by the Expos.

Spring training
After holding spring training at City Island Ball Park in Daytona Beach, Florida, from 1973 to 1980, the Expos returned to West Palm Beach Municipal Stadium in West Palm Beach, Florida – a facility they shared with the Atlanta Braves – for spring training in 1981. It was their fifth season at the stadium; they also had conducted spring training there from 1969 to 1972. The Expos would train at Municipal Stadium through 1997.

Regular season 
 April 29, 1981: Steve Carlton struck out Tim Wallach for the 3000th strikeout of his career.
 May 10, 1981: Charlie Lea pitched a no-hitter against the San Francisco Giants, defeating them 4–0 at Olympic Stadium. The last out was recorded by Andre Dawson in center field. Lea would go on to shut out the Giants again a week later on four hits in San Francisco for good measure.

Game log

First half

|-  style="text-align:center; background:#bfb;"
| 1 || April 9 || @ Pirates || 6–5 || Fryman (1–0) || Tekulve (0–1) || || 40,332 || 1–0 || Boxscore
|-  style="text-align:center; background:#fbb;"
| 2 || April 12 || @ Pirates || 2–3 || Rhoden (1–0) || Burris (0–1) || Romo (1) || 8,430 || 1–1 || Boxscore
|-  style="text-align:center; background:#bfb;"
| 3 || April 15 || Cubs || 5–4 || Bahnsen (1–0) || Tidrow (1–1) || || 30,003 || 2–1 || Boxscore
|-  style="text-align:center; background:#bfb;"
| 4 || April 16 || Cubs || 7–0 || Sanderson (1–0) || McGlothen (0–1) || || 11,602 || 3–1 || Boxscore
|-  style="text-align:center; background:#bfb;"
| 5 || April 18 || @ Mets || 5–3 || Gullickson (1–0) || Jones (0–1) || Bahnsen (1) || 23,710 || 4–1 || Boxscore
|-  style="text-align:center; background:#bfb;"
| 6 || April 19 || @ Mets || 4–3 || Burris (1–1) || Swan (0–1) || Fryman (1) || N/A || 5–1 || Boxscore
|-  style="text-align:center; background:#fbb;"
| 7 || April 19 || @ Mets || 2–7 || Zachry (3–0) || Lea (0–1) || || 21,464 || 5–2 || Boxscore
|-  style="text-align:center; background:#bfb;"
| 8 || April 20 || Phillies || 9–8 || Rogers (1–0) || McGraw (1–1) || Fryman (2) || 24,817 || 6–2 || Boxscore
|-  style="text-align:center; background:#bfb;"
| 9 || April 21 || Phillies || 10–3 || Sanderson (2–0) || Ruthven (2–1) || || 10,887 || 7–2 || Boxscore
|-  style="text-align:center; background:#bfb;"
| 10 || April 22 || Phillies || 4–3 (11 inn.) || Sosa (1–0) || McGraw (1–2) || || 14,176 || 8–2 || Boxscore
|-  style="text-align:center; background:#bbb;"
| || April 24 || Mets || colspan=7 |Postponed (rain); rescheduled for April 26
|-  style="text-align:center; background:#bfb;"
| 11 || April 25 || Mets || 4–2 || Rogers (2–0) || Jones (0–2) || Lee (1) || 18,150 || 9–2 || Boxscore
|-  style="text-align:center; background:#bfb;"
| 12 || April 26 || Mets || 8–4 || Burris (2–1) || Zachry (3–1) || || N/A || 10–2 || Boxscore
|-  style="text-align:center; background:#bfb;"
| 13 || April 26 || Mets || 7–6 || Sanderson (3–0) || Swan (0–2) || Fryman (3) || 41,697 || 11–2 || Boxscore
|-  style="text-align:center; background:#fbb;"
| 14 || April 27 || @ Phillies || 1–3 || Ruthven (3–1) || Gullickson (1–1) || || 27,347 || 11–3 || Boxscore
|-  style="text-align:center; background:#bfb;"
| 15 || April 28 || @ Phillies || 6–3 || Ratzer (1–0) || Christenson (1–2) || Sosa (1) || 26,192 || 12–3 || Boxscore
|-  style="text-align:center; background:#fbb;"
| 16 || April 29 || @ Phillies || 2–6 || Carlton (4–0) || Rogers (2–1) || || 30,142 || 12–4 || Boxscore
|-

|-  style="text-align:center; background:#bfb;"
| 17 || May 1 || Dodgers || 9–8 (13 inn.) || Lee (1–0) || Castillo (0–2) || || 28,179 || 13–4 || Boxscore
|-  style="text-align:center; background:#fbb;"
| 18 || May 2 || Dodgers || 0–4 || Reuss (2–1) || Sanderson (3–1) || || 22,820 || 13–5 || Boxscore
|-  style="text-align:center; background:#fbb;"
| 19 || May 3 || Dodgers || 1–6 (10 inn.) || Valenzuela (6–0) || Gullickson (1–2) || || 46,405 || 13–6 || Boxscore
|-  style="text-align:center; background:#bfb;"
| 20 || May 4 || Dodgers || 4–3 || Rogers (3–1) || Sutcliffe (2–2) || Sosa (2) || 21,527 || 14–6 || Boxscore
|-  style="text-align:center; background:#bfb;"
| 21 || May 5 || Padres || 4–3 || Fryman (2–0) || || || 15,909 || 15–6 || Boxscore
|-  style="text-align:center; background:#fbb;"
| 22 || May 6 || Padres || 5–13 || || Burris (2–2) || || 13,066 || 15–7 || Boxscore
|-  style="text-align:center; background:#bfb;"
| 23 || May 7 || Padres || 2–1 || Sanderson (4–1) || || || 12,248 || 16–7 || Boxscore
|-  style="text-align:center; background:#fbb;"
| 24 || May 8 || Giants || 3–4 || || Gullickson (1–3) || || 21,850 || 16–8 || Boxscore
|-  style="text-align:center; background:#fbb;"
| 25 || May 9 || Giants || 2–8 || || Rogers (3–2) || || 48,149 || 16–9 || Boxscore
|-  style="text-align:center; background:#fbb;"
| 26 || May 10 || Giants || 1–5 || || Lee (1–1) || || N/A || 16–10 || Boxscore
|-  style="text-align:center; background:#bfb;"
| 27 || May 10 || Giants || 4–0 || Lea (1–1) || || || 25,343 || 17–10 || Boxscore
|-  style="text-align:center; background:#fbb;"
| 28 || May 12 || @ Dodgers || 0–5 || Hooton (5–0) || Burris (2–3) || Howe (4) || 34,367 || 17–11 || Boxscore
|-  style="text-align:center; background:#fbb;"
| 29 || May 13 || @ Dodgers || 6–8 || Howe (2–1) || Fryman (2–1) || || 42,712 || 17–12 || Boxscore
|-  style="text-align:center; background:#fbb;"
| 30 || May 14 || @ Dodgers || 2–3 || Valenzuela (8–0) || Ratzer (1–1) || || 53,906 || 17–13 || Boxscore
|-  style="text-align:center; background:#fbb;"
| 31 || May 15 || @ Giants || 2–4 || || Rogers (3–3) || || 19,763 || 17–14 || Boxscore
|-  style="text-align:center; background:#bfb;"
| 32 || May 16 || @ Giants || 5–0 || Lea (2–1) || || || 11,133 || 18–14 || Boxscore
|-  style="text-align:center; background:#fbb;"
| 33 || May 17 || @ Giants || 4–5 (12 inn.) || || Lee (1–2) || || 27,975 || 18–15 || Boxscore
|-  style="text-align:center; background:#bfb;"
| 34 || May 18 || @ Padres || 3–2 (10 inn.) || Fryman (3–1) || || Lee (2) || 13,283 || 19–15 || Boxscore
|-  style="text-align:center; background:#fbb;"
| 35 || May 19 || @ Padres || 1–3 || || Gullickson (1–4) || || 6,871 || 19–16 || Boxscore
|-  style="text-align:center; background:#bfb;"
| 36 || May 20 || @ Padres || 6–2 || Rogers (4–3) || || || 9,336 || 20–16 || Boxscore
|-  style="text-align:center; background:#bfb;"
| 37 || May 22 || @ Cubs || 6–3 || Lea (3–1) || Krukow (1–5) || || 6,071 || 21–16 || Boxscore
|-  style="text-align:center; background:#fbb;"
| 38 || May 23 || @ Cubs || 4–6 || Reuschel (2–5) || Burris (2–4) || Tidrow (2) || 15,981 || 21–17 || Boxscore
|-  style="text-align:center; background:#fbb;"
| 39 || May 24 || @ Cubs || 2–6 || Caudill (1–3) || Sanderson (4–2) || Tidrow (3) || 10,821 || 21–18 || Boxscore
|-  style="text-align:center; background:#bfb;"
| 40 || May 25 || Cardinals || 5–3 || Gullickson (2–4) || || Lee (3) || 24,490 || 22–18 || Boxscore
|-  style="text-align:center; background:#bfb;"
| 41 || May 26 || Cardinals || 4–3 || Rogers (5–3) || || Sosa (3) || 27,775 || 23–18 || Boxscore
|-  style="text-align:center; background:#bfb;"
| 42 || May 27 || Cardinals || 4–1 || Lea (4–1) || || Lee (4) || 24,709 || 24–18 || Boxscore
|-  style="text-align:center; background:#bfb;"
| 43 || May 29 || Pirates || 3–2 || Sanderson (5–2) || Bibby (3–3) || Lee (5) || 36,662 || 25–18 || Boxscore
|-  style="text-align:center; background:#fbb;"
| 44 || May 30 || Pirates || 2–3 || Rhoden (6–0) || Gullickson (2–5) || || 31,649 || 25–19 || Boxscore
|-  style="text-align:center; background:#bfb;"
| 45 || May 31 || Pirates || 5–1 || Rogers (6–3) || Pérez (2–1) || || 45,783 || 26–19 || Boxscore
|-

|-  style="text-align:center; background:#fbb;"
| 46 || June 1 || @ Cardinals || 2–4 || || Lea (4–2) || || 14,224 || 26–20 || Boxscore
|-  style="text-align:center; background:#bfb;"
| 47 || June 2 || @ Cardinals || 8–1 || Burris (3–4) || || || 14,697 || 27–20 || Boxscore
|-  style="text-align:center; background:#fbb;"
| 48 || June 3 || @ Cardinals || 2–3 (11 inn.) || || Sosa (1–1) || || 13,085 || 27–21 || Boxscore
|-  style="text-align:center; background:#fbb;"
| 49 || June 4 || @ Cardinals || 1–4 || || Gullickson (2–6) || || 18,958 || 27–22 || Boxscore
|-  style="text-align:center; background:#fbb;"
| 50 || June 5 || @ Reds || 3–6 || || Rogers (6–4) || || || 27–23 || Boxscore
|-  style="text-align:center; background:#fbb;"
| 51 || June 6 || @ Reds || 3–9 || || Lea (4–3) || || || 27–24 || Boxscore
|-  style="text-align:center; background:#fbb;"
| 52 || June 7 || @ Reds || 0–2 || || Burris (3–5) || || || 27–25 || Boxscore
|-  style="text-align:center; background:#bfb;"
| 53 || June 9 || Braves || 12–1 || Sanderson (6–2) || || || || 28–25 || Boxscore
|-  style="text-align:center; background:#bfb;"
| 54 || June 10 || Braves || 11–2 || Gullickson (3–6) || || || || 29–25 || Boxscore
|-  style="text-align:center; background:#bfb;"
| 55 || June 11 || Braves || 7–0 || Rogers (7–4) || || || || 30–25 || Boxscore
|-

Games cancelled

|-  style="text-align:center; background:#bbb;"
| || April 11 || @ Pirates || colspan=7 |Cancelled (strike)
|-  style="text-align:center; background:#bbb;"
| || April 14 || Cubs || colspan=7 |Cancelled (strike)
|-

|-  style="text-align:center; background:#bbb;"
| || June 12 || Reds || colspan=7 |Cancelled (strike)
|-  style="text-align:center; background:#bbb;"
| || June 13 || Reds || colspan=7 |Cancelled (strike)
|-  style="text-align:center; background:#bbb;"
| || June 14 || Reds || colspan=7 |Cancelled (strike)
|-  style="text-align:center; background:#bbb;"
| || June 15 || Astros || colspan=7 |Cancelled (strike)
|-  style="text-align:center; background:#bbb;"
| || June 16 || Astros || colspan=7 |Cancelled (strike)
|-  style="text-align:center; background:#bbb;"
| || June 17 || @ Braves || colspan=7 |Cancelled (strike)
|-  style="text-align:center; background:#bbb;"
| || June 18 || @ Braves || colspan=7 |Cancelled (strike)
|-  style="text-align:center; background:#bbb;"
| || June 19 || @ Astros || colspan=7 |Cancelled (strike)
|-  style="text-align:center; background:#bbb;"
| || June 20 || @ Astros || colspan=7 |Cancelled (strike)
|-  style="text-align:center; background:#bbb;"
| || June 21 || @ Astros || colspan=7 |Cancelled (strike)
|-  style="text-align:center; background:#bbb;"
| || June 23 || Mets || colspan=7 |Cancelled (strike)
|-  style="text-align:center; background:#bbb;"
| || June 24 || Mets || colspan=7 |Cancelled (strike)
|-  style="text-align:center; background:#bbb;"
| || June 25 || Mets || colspan=7 |Cancelled (strike)
|-  style="text-align:center; background:#bbb;"
| || June 26 || Cubs || colspan=7 |Cancelled (strike)
|-  style="text-align:center; background:#bbb;"
| || June 27 || Cubs || colspan=7 |Cancelled (strike)
|-  style="text-align:center; background:#bbb;"
| || June 28 || Cubs || colspan=7 |Cancelled (strike)
|-  style="text-align:center; background:#bbb;"
| || June 29 || @ Pirates || colspan=7 |Cancelled (strike)
|-  style="text-align:center; background:#bbb;"
| || June 30 || @ Pirates || colspan=7 |Cancelled (strike)
|-

|-  style="text-align:center; background:#bbb;"
| || July 1 || Pirates || colspan=7 |Cancelled (strike)
|-  style="text-align:center; background:#bbb;"
| || July 2 || Pirates || colspan=7 |Cancelled (strike)
|-  style="text-align:center; background:#bbb;"
| || July 3 || @ Phillies || colspan=7 |Cancelled (strike)
|-  style="text-align:center; background:#bbb;"
| || July 4 || @ Phillies || colspan=7 |Cancelled (strike)
|-  style="text-align:center; background:#bbb;"
| || July 5 || @ Phillies || colspan=7 |Cancelled (strike)
|-  style="text-align:center; background:#bbb;"
| || July 7 || @ Cubs || colspan=7 |Cancelled (strike)
|-  style="text-align:center; background:#bbb;"
| || July 8 || @ Cubs || colspan=7 |Cancelled (strike)
|-  style="text-align:center; background:#bbb;"
| || July 9 || @ Cubs || colspan=7 |Cancelled (strike)
|-  style="text-align:center; background:#bbb;"
| || July 10 || @ Cardinals || colspan=7 |Cancelled (strike)
|-  style="text-align:center; background:#bbb;"
| || July 11 || @ Cardinals || colspan=7 |Cancelled (strike)
|-  style="text-align:center; background:#bbb;"
| || July 12 || @ Cardinals || colspan=7 |Cancelled (strike)
|-  style="text-align:center; background:#bbb;"
| || July 16 || Dodgers || colspan=7 |Cancelled (strike)
|-  style="text-align:center; background:#bbb;"
| || July 17 || Dodgers || colspan=7 |Cancelled (strike)
|-  style="text-align:center; background:#bbb;"
| || July 18 || Padres || colspan=7 |Cancelled (strike)
|-  style="text-align:center; background:#bbb;"
| || July 19 || Padres || colspan=7 |Cancelled (strike)
|-  style="text-align:center; background:#bbb;"
| || July 20 || Padres || colspan=7 |Cancelled (strike)
|-  style="text-align:center; background:#bbb;"
| || July 21 || Giants || colspan=7 |Cancelled (strike)
|-  style="text-align:center; background:#bbb;"
| || July 22 || Giants || colspan=7 |Cancelled (strike)
|-  style="text-align:center; background:#bbb;"
| || July 24 || @ Dodgers || colspan=7 |Cancelled (strike)
|-  style="text-align:center; background:#bbb;"
| || July 25 || @ Dodgers || colspan=7 |Cancelled (strike)
|-  style="text-align:center; background:#bbb;"
| || July 26 || @ Dodgers || colspan=7 |Cancelled (strike)
|-  style="text-align:center; background:#bbb;"
| || July 28 || @ Giants || colspan=7 |Cancelled (strike)
|-  style="text-align:center; background:#bbb;"
| || July 29 || @ Giants || colspan=7 |Cancelled (strike)
|-  style="text-align:center; background:#bbb;"
| || July 30 || @ Giants || colspan=7 |Cancelled (strike)
|-  style="text-align:center; background:#bbb;"
| || July 31 || @ Padres || colspan=7 |Cancelled (strike)
|-

|-  style="text-align:center; background:#bbb;"
| || August 1 || @ Padres || colspan=7 |Cancelled (strike)
|-  style="text-align:center; background:#bbb;"
| || August 2 || @ Padres || colspan=7 |Cancelled (strike)
|-  style="text-align:center; background:#bbb;"
| || August 4 || @ Mets || colspan=7 |Cancelled (strike)
|-  style="text-align:center; background:#bbb;"
| || August 5 || @ Mets || colspan=7 |Cancelled (strike)
|-  style="text-align:center; background:#bbb;"
| || August 6 || @ Mets || colspan=7 |Cancelled (strike)
|-  style="text-align:center; background:#bbb;"
| || August 7 || Phillies || colspan=7 |Cancelled (strike)
|-  style="text-align:center; background:#bbb;"
| || August 8 || Phillies || colspan=7 |Cancelled (strike)
|-  style="text-align:center; background:#bbb;"
| || August 9 || Phillies || colspan=7 |Cancelled (strike)
|-  style="text-align:center; background:#bbb;"
| || August 9 || Phillies || colspan=7 |Cancelled (strike)
|-

Second half

|-  style="text-align:center; background:#bbcaff;"
|align="center" colspan="10"|All-Star Break: NL def. AL at Cleveland Stadium, 5–4
|-  style="text-align:center; background:#bfb;"
| 56 || August 10 || Pirates || 3–1 || Lee (2–2) || Pérez (2–3) || || 37,275 || 31–25 || Boxscore
|-  style="text-align:center; background:#fbb;"
| 57 || August 11 || Pirates || 3–6 || Tekulve (3–3) || Fryman (3–2) || || 33,045 || 31–26 || Boxscore
|-  style="text-align:center; background:#bfb;"
| 58 || August 12 || @ Pirates || 3–2 || Burris (4–5) || Solomon (5–4) || Lee (6) || 12,069 || 32–26 || Boxscore
|-  style="text-align:center; background:#bfb;"
| 59 || August 13 || @ Pirates || 7–2 || Rogers (8–4) || Tiant (0–1) || || 11,735 || 33–26 || Boxscore
|-  style="text-align:center; background:#fbb;"
| 60 || August 14 || Cardinals || 1–3 || || Sanderson (6–3) || || 40,187 || 33–27 || Boxscore
|-  style="text-align:center; background:#bbb;"
| || August 15 || Cardinals || colspan=7 |Postponed (rain); rescheduled for September 15
|-  style="text-align:center; background:#bbb;"
| || August 16 || Cardinals || colspan=7 |Postponed (rain); rescheduled for September 16
|-  style="text-align:center; background:#bfb;"
| 61 || August 17 || @ Astros || 6–2 || Burris (5–5) || || Fryman (4) || || 34–27 || Boxscore
|-  style="text-align:center; background:#fbb;"
| 62 || August 18 || @ Astros || 2–4 || || Rogers (8–5) || || || 34–28 || Boxscore
|-  style="text-align:center; background:#fbb;"
| 63 || August 19 || @ Astros || 1–9 || || Sanderson (6–4) || || || 34–29 || Boxscore
|-  style="text-align:center; background:#bfb;"
| 64 || August 21 || @ Braves || 4–1 (11 inn.) || Fryman (4–2) || || || || 35–29 || Boxscore
|-  style="text-align:center; background:#bfb;"
| 65 || August 22 || @ Braves || 5–4 || Bahnsen (2–0) || || Reardon (1) || || 36–29 || Boxscore
|-  style="text-align:center; background:#fbb;"
| 66 || August 22 || @ Braves || 1–9 || || Lea (4–4) || || || 36–30 || Boxscore
|-  style="text-align:center; background:#fbb;"
| 67 || August 23 || @ Braves || 1–2 || || Rogers (8–6) || || || 36–31 || Boxscore
|-  style="text-align:center; background:#bfb;"
| 68 || August 25 || Reds || 9–1 || Sanderson (7–4) || || || || 37–31 || Boxscore
|-  style="text-align:center; background:#bfb;"
| 69 || August 26 || Reds || 6–0 || Gullickson (4–6) || || || || 38–31 || Boxscore
|-  style="text-align:center; background:#bfb;"
| 70 || August 27 || Reds || 12–0 || Burris (6–5) || || || || 39–31 || Boxscore
|-  style="text-align:center; background:#bfb;"
| 71 || August 28 || Braves || 3–0 || Rogers (9–6) || || || || 40–31 || Boxscore
|-  style="text-align:center; background:#bfb;"
| 72 || August 29 || Braves || 4–3 || Reardon (1–0) || || || || 41–31 || Boxscore
|-  style="text-align:center; background:#fbb;"
| 73 || August 30 || Braves || 4–5 (12 inn.) || || Lee (2–3) || || || 41–32 || Boxscore
|-  style="text-align:center; background:#fbb;"
| 74 || August 31 || @ Reds || 8–9 || || Lee (2–4) || || || 41–33 || Boxscore
|-

|-  style="text-align:center; background:#bfb;"
| 75 || September 1 || @ Reds || 4–3 || Lea (5–4) || || Reardon (2) || || 42–33 || Boxscore
|-  style="text-align:center; background:#fbb;"
| 76 || September 2 || @ Reds || 0–7 || || Bahnsen (2–1) || || || 42–34 || Boxscore
|-  style="text-align:center; background:#fbb;"
| 77 || September 3 || Astros || 1–2 || || Sanderson (7–5) || || || 42–35 || Boxscore
|-  style="text-align:center; background:#fbb;"
| 78 || September 4 || Astros || 0–5 || || Gullickson (4–7) || || || 42–36 || Boxscore
|-  style="text-align:center; background:#bfb;"
| 79 || September 5 || Astros || 5–2 || Burris (7–5) || || || || 43–36 || Boxscore
|-  style="text-align:center; background:#fbb;"
| 80 || September 6 || Astros || 3–4 (12 inn.) || || Sosa (1–2) || || || 43–37 || Boxscore
|-  style="text-align:center; background:#bfb;"
| 81 || September 7 || @ Phillies || 5–4 || Fryman (5–2) || Proly (2–1) || Reardon (3) || 31,401 || 45–36 || Boxscore
|-  style="text-align:center; background:#fbb;"
| 82 || September 8 || @ Phillies || 5–10 || Larson (1–0) || Sanderson (7–6) || || 11,812 || 45–37 || Boxscore
|-  style="text-align:center; background:#fbb;"
| 83 || September 9 || @ Phillies || 8–11 || Reed (4–1) || Fryman (5–3) || Lyle (1) || 25,468 || 45–38 || Boxscore
|-  style="text-align:center; background:#fbb;"
| 84 || September 11 || @ Cubs || 5–6 || Griffin (2–2) || Burris (7–6) || Hernández (2) || 7,204 || 45–39 || Boxscore
|-  style="text-align:center; background:#bfb;"
| 85 || September 12 || @ Cubs || 2–0 || Rogers (10–6) || Bird (4–3) || Reardon (4) || 18,124 || 45–40 || Boxscore
|-  style="text-align:center; background:#bfb;"
| 86 || September 13 || @ Cubs || 10–6 || Sanderson (8–6) || Krukow (6–9) || || 14,589 || 46–40 || Boxscore
|-  style="text-align:center; background:#fbb;"
| 87 || September 15 || Cardinals || 2–3 || || Gullickson (3–8) || || N/A || 46–41 || Boxscore
|-  style="text-align:center; background:#bfb;"
| 88 || September 15 || Cardinals || 4–3 || Lee (3–4) || || Fryman (5) || 41,671 || 47–41 || Boxscore
|-  style="text-align:center; background:#fbb;"
| 89 || September 16 || Cardinals || 1–7 || || Burris (7–7) || || N/A || 47–42 || Boxscore
|-  style="text-align:center; background:#bfb;"
| 90 || September 16 || Cardinals || 4–3 (11 inn.) || Reardon (2–0) || || || 30,222 || 48–42 || Boxscore
|-  style="text-align:center; background:#fbb;"
| 91 || September 17 || Cardinals || 4–7 || || Rogers (10–7) || || 26,390 || 48–43 || Boxscore
|-  style="text-align:center; background:#bfb;"
| 92 || September 18 || Cubs || 11–0 || Sanderson (9–6) || Bird (4–4) || || 23,606 || 49–43 || Boxscore
|-  style="text-align:center; background:#fbb;"
| 93 || September 19 || Cubs || 1–2 || Krukow (7–9) || Lee (3–5) || Martz (4) || 30,099 || 49–44 || Boxscore
|-  style="text-align:center; background:#bfb;"
| 94 || September 20 || Cubs || 4–0 || Gullickson (4–8) || Griffin (2–4) || || 40,851 || 50–44 || Boxscore
|-  style="text-align:center; background:#bfb;"
| 95 || September 21 || Phillies || 1–0 (17 inn.) || Smith (1–0) || Reed (0–1) || || 24,161 || 51–44 || Boxscore
|-  style="text-align:center; background:#bfb;"
| 96 || September 22 || Phillies || 6–2 || Rogers (11–7) || Ruthven (11–6) || || 21,797 || 52–44 || Boxscore
|-  style="text-align:center; background:#bfb;"
| 97 || September 23 || Pirates || 3–2 || Jackson (2–2) || Rhoden (8–4) || || 10,081 || 53–44 || Boxscore
|-  style="text-align:center; background:#bfb;"
| 98 || September 24 || Pirates || 7–1 || Lee (4–5) || Jones (4–4) || || 23,459 || 54–44 || Boxscore
|-  style="text-align:center; background:#bfb;"
| 99 || September 25 || Mets || 6–3 || Gullickson (5–8) || Zachry (7–13) || || 41,354 || 55–44 || Boxscore
|-  style="text-align:center; background:#bfb;"
| 100 || September 26 || Mets || 4–2 || Burris (8–7) || Harris (3–5) || Fryman (6) || 38,821 || 56–44 || Boxscore
|-  style="text-align:center; background:#fbb;"
| 101 || September 27 || Mets || 1–2 || Scott (5–10) || Rogers (11–8) || Allen (18) || 52,089 || 56–45 || Boxscore
|-  style="text-align:center; background:#fbb;"
| 102 || September 28 || @ Cardinals || 2–6 || || Sanderson (9–7) || || 21,216 || 56–46 || Boxscore
|-  style="text-align:center; background:#fbb;"
| 103 || September 29 || @ Cardinals || 4–8 || || Lee (4–6) || || 40,488 || 56–47 || Boxscore
|-  style="text-align:center; background:#bfb;"
| 104 || September 30 || @ Pirates || 3–2 || Gullickson (6–8) || Solomon (8–6) || Fryman (7) || 5,826 || 57–47 || Boxscore
|-

|-  style="text-align:center; background:#bfb;"
| 105 || October 1 || @ Pirates || 5–2 || Burris (9–7) || Tiant (2–5) || Reardon (5) || 2,931 || 58–47 || Boxscore
|-  style="text-align:center; background:#bfb;"
| 106 || October 2 || @ Mets || 3–0 || Rogers (12–8) || Zachry (7–14) || || 6,720 || 59–47 || Boxscore
|-  style="text-align:center; background:#bfb;"
| 107 || October 3 || @ Mets || 5–4 || Lee (5–6) || Allen (7–6) || Reardon (6) || 17,954 || 60–47 || Boxscore
|-  style="text-align:center; background:#fbb;"
| 108 || October 4 || @ Mets || 1–2 || Falcone (5–3) || Gullickson (6–9) || || 7,618 || 60–48 || Boxscore
|-

Season standings

Record vs. opponents

Notable transactions 
 April 1, 1981: John Tamargo was released by the Expos.
 May 29, 1981: Ellis Valentine was traded by the Expos to the New York Mets for Jeff Reardon and Dan Norman.
 June 8, 1981: 1981 Major League Baseball draft
Mike Fuentes was drafted by the Expos in the 2nd round.
Mark McGwire was drafted by the Expos in the 8th round.
Marvin Freeman was drafted by the Expos in the 9th round, but did not sign.
Al Newman was drafted by the Expos in the 1st round (12th pick) of the Secondary Phase.
 August 20, 1981: Willie Montañez was traded by the Expos to the Pittsburgh Pirates for John Milner.

Major League debuts
Batters:
Terry Francona (Aug 19)
Mike Gates (May 6)
Dave Hostetler (Sep 15)
Tony Johnson (Sep 27)
Wallace Johnson (Sep 8)
Pat Rooney (Sep 9)
Chris Smith (May 14)
Tom Wieghaus (Oct 4)
Pitchers:
Rick Engle (Sep 2)
Tom Gorman (Sep 2)
Bryn Smith (Sep 8)

Opening Day starters 
 Gary Carter
 Warren Cromartie
 Andre Dawson
 Larry Parrish
 Tim Raines
 Steve Rogers
 Rodney Scott
 Chris Speier
 Ellis Valentine

Roster

Player stats

Batting

Starters by position 
Note: Pos = Position; G = Games played; AB = At bats; H = Hits; Avg. = Batting average; HR = Home runs; RBI = Runs batted in

Other batters 
Note: G = Games played; AB = At bats; H = Hits; Avg. = Batting average; HR = Home runs; RBI = Runs batted in

Pitching

Starting pitchers 
Note: G = Games pitched, IP = Innings pitched; W = Wins; L = Losses; ERA = Earned run average; SO = Strikeouts

Other pitchers 
Note: G = Games pitched; IP = Innings pitched; W = Wins; L = Losses; ERA = Earned run average; SO = Strikeouts

Relief pitchers 
Note: G = Games pitched; IP = Innings pitched; W = Wins; L = Losses; SV = Saves; ERA = Earned run average; SO = Strikeouts

Postseason

Game log

|-  style="text-align:center; background:#bfb;"
| Game 1 || October 7 || Phillies || 3–1 || Rogers (1–0) || Carlton (0–1) || Reardon (1) || 34,237 || Expos lead 1–0 || Boxscore
|-  style="text-align:center; background:#bfb;"
| Game 2 || October 8 || Phillies || 3–1 || Gullickson (1–0) || Ruthven (0–1) || Reardon (2) || 45,896 || Expos lead 2–0 || Boxscore
|-  style="text-align:center; background:#fbb;"
| Game 3 || October 9 || @ Phillies || 2–6 || Christenson (1–0) || Burris (0–1) || || 36,835 || Expos lead 2–1 || Boxscore
|-  style="text-align:center; background:#fbb;"
| Game 4 || October 10 || @ Phillies || 5–6 (10 inn.) || McGraw (1–0) || Reardon (0–1) || || 38,818 || Series tied 2–2 || Boxscore
|-  style="text-align:center; background:#bfb;"
| Game 5 || October 11 || @ Phillies || 3–0 || Rogers (2–0) || Carlton (0–2) || || 47,384 || Expos win 3–2 || Boxscore
|-

|-  style="text-align:center; background:#fbb;"
| Game 1 || October 13 || @ Dodgers || 1–5 || Hooton (1–0) || Gullickson (0–1) || || 51,273 || Dodgers lead 1–0 || Boxscore
|-  style="text-align:center; background:#bfb;"
| Game 2 || October 14 || @ Dodgers || 3–0 || Burris (1–0) || Valenzuela (0–1) || || 53,463 || Series tied 1–1 || Boxscore
|-  style="text-align:center; background:#bfb;"
| Game 3 || October 16 || Dodgers || 4–1 || Rogers (1–0) || Reuss (0–1) || || 54,372 || Expos lead 2–1 || Boxscore
|-  style="text-align:center; background:#fbb;"
| Game 4 || October 17 || Dodgers || 1–7 || Hooton (2–0) || Gullickson (0–2) || || 54,499 || Series tied 2–2 || Boxscore
|-  style="text-align:center; background:#bbb;"
| || October 18 || Dodgers || colspan=7 |Postponed (rain); rescheduled for October 19
|-  style="text-align:center; background:#fbb;"
| Game 5 || October 19 || Dodgers || 1–2 || Valenzuela (1–1) || Rogers (1–1) || Welch (1) || 36,491 || Dodgers win 3–2 || Boxscore
|-

National League Division Series

Montreal Expos vs. Philadelphia Phillies 
Montreal wins series, 3–2.

 October 11, 1981 – Steve Rogers defeats Steve Carlton of the Phillies 3–0 in a pitchers' duel to win the National League Division Series. Rogers drove in two of the three Expos runs to boot singling home Larry Parrish and Chris Speier in the fifth inning. The Expos advance to play the Dodgers who defeated the Astros. Rogers previously defeated Carlton in game one of the series as well.

National League Championship Series

Game 1 
October 13, Dodger Stadium, Los Angeles

Game 2 
October 14, Dodger Stadium, Los Angeles

Game 3 
October 16, Olympic Stadium, Montreal, Quebec

Game 4 
October 17, Olympic Stadium, Montreal, Quebec

Game 5 
October 19, Olympic Stadium, Montreal, Quebec

 October 19, 1981: Blue Monday. In the decisive Game 5 of their only National League Championship Series, the Expos were defeated at home, 2–1, by the Los Angeles Dodgers. Tim Raines opened the bottom of the first with a double against Cy Young Award-winning rookie sensation Fernando Valenzuela and scored on an Andre Dawson double play ball. Valenzuela held the Expos scoreless the rest of the way, however, and the Dodgers tied the game at 1 in the top of the fifth with two hits, a wild pitch and an RBI ground out off Expo starter Ray Burris. The teams remained tied until the top of the ninth, when Expo manager Jim Fanning made a risky decision to relieve Burris with Game 3 winner Steve Rogers. Struggling closer Jeff Reardon was throwing alongside Rogers in the bullpen at the time, but Fanning elected to summon his ace. Rogers retired Steve Garvey and Ron Cey in order, but outfielder Rick Monday homered to put Los Angeles ahead, 2–1, and crush the Expos' hopes of advancing to the World Series. Two-out walks from Gary Carter and Larry Parrish were all that the Expos could muster in the 9th, as Bob Welch preserved the one-run Dodger victory. The Expos lost the NLCS, 3–2, and never returned to the postseason again until 2012 as the Washington Nationals.

Awards and honors 
 Gary Carter, All-Star Game MVP
 Gary Carter, Gold Glove Award, Catcher
 Andre Dawson, Gold Glove Award, Outfield
 Charlie Lea, Pitcher of the Month Award, May
 Tim Raines, OF, The Sporting News Rookie of the Year Award
 Tim Raines, National League Leader, 71 Stolen Bases

52nd Major League Baseball All-Star Game
All-Star Game
 Gary Carter, National League catcher, starter
 Andre Dawson, National League outfield, starter
 Tim Raines, National League outfield, reserve
 Dick Williams, National League coach

Farm system

References

Further reading

External links 
 1981 Montreal Expos team at Baseball-Reference
 1981 Montreal Expos team at baseball-almanac.com

Montreal Expos seasons
Montreal Expos season
1981
1980s in Montreal
1981 in Quebec